Nikolai Vasilyevich Nevrev (1830, Moscow – 3 May 1904, Mogilev Governorate) was a Russian painter who specialized in genre and historical scenes.

Life
Nevrev was born to a family of merchants. His first art lessons came from his stepfather, who was a drawing teacher. At the age of 21, Nevrev entered the Moscow School of Painting, Sculpture and Architecture (MSPSA), where he studied under the Russian-Italian painter, Mikhail Scotti. Upon graduating in 1855, he was named a "Free Artist".  In the 60s, Nevrev painted one of his masterpieces, "The Bargain" (1866), in which he depicted the sale of a serf.  Some other paintings focused on criticisms of the Church.

He temporarily stopped working in the 1870s, for unknown reasons, but began painting historical art in the 80s. In 1881, he became a member of the Association of Travelling Art Exhibitions. His best work during this time was arguably his genre paintings, each exhibiting a human moral. From 1887 to 1890, he taught at the MSPSA and, in 1889, became curator at the Tretyakov Gallery.

In 1898, following the death of Pavel Tretyakov, he was offered the position of Director at the gallery, but declined, citing old age and poor health. At the age of 74, in great financial distress, he committed suicide by shooting himself at his estate near Mogilev.

On 25 September 1980, the Soviet Union issued a 6 kopek postage stamp  commemorating the 150th anniversary of his birth (together with that of Konstantin Flavitsky).

An international open-air painting festival is held annually in his honor in the Mogilev Region of Belarus.

Gallery

References

Further reading
 Vladislav Artemov, Николай Неврев (Masters of Painting series), Белый город, 2004

External links

"Nikolai Nevrev" by Olga Sarnova @ Moscow Journal

19th-century painters from the Russian Empire
Russian male painters
20th-century Russian painters
1830 births
1904 deaths
Artists from Moscow
Artists who committed suicide
Russian genre painters
History painters
1904 suicides
Suicides by firearm in Russia
19th-century male artists from the Russian Empire
20th-century Russian male artists
Moscow School of Painting, Sculpture and Architecture alumni